A Charming Man is a Czechoslovak comedy film directed by Martin Frič. It was released in 1941.

Cast
 Oldřich Nový as Viktor Bláha
 Ladislav Pešek as Jam Valtera
 Nataša Gollová as Polda Krusinová
 Lída Chválová as Karla Hasková
 Theodor Pištěk as Vitalis Hasek
 Ella Nollová as Grandmother Hasková
 Raoul Schránil as Ing. Ivan Molenda
 Jaroslav Marvan as JUDr. Kouril, advokát
 František Filipovský as Jaroslav Stárek
 Antonín Zacpal as Prof. Matousek
 Svetla Svozilová as Matousek's wife
 Zdeňka Baldová as Mrs. Malá, widow
 Blažena Slavíčková as Emilka
 Ferenc Futurista as Mr. Fretka
 Marie Blazková as Woman

References

External links
 

1941 films
1940s Czech-language films
1941 comedy films
Czechoslovak black-and-white films
Films directed by Martin Frič
Czechoslovak comedy films
1940s Czech films